Popeni may refer to several places in Romania:

 Popeni, a village in Căiuți Commune, Bacău County
 Popeni, a village in Brăești Commune, Botoșani County
 Popeni, a village in George Enescu Commune, Botoșani County
 Popeni, a village in Mirșid Commune, Sălaj County
 Popeni, a village in Găgești Commune, Vaslui County
 Popeni, a village in Zorleni Commune, Vaslui County
 Popeni (river), a tributary of the Trotuș in Bacău County